Dull is an unincorporated community in Liberty Township, Van Wert County, Ohio, United States.

History
Dull was originally called McKee, and under the latter name was laid out in 1879 by J. M. Dull and others. A post office was established under the name Dull in 1880, and remained in operation until 1909. The community is sometimes called Dulltown.

References

Unincorporated communities in Van Wert County, Ohio
Unincorporated communities in Ohio
1879 establishments in Ohio
Populated places established in 1879